Steven D. Loucks (born September 8, 1961) is an American politician and lobbyist who served as a member of the Wisconsin State Assembly from 1988 to 1992.

Early life and education
Loucks was born in Saint Paul, Minnesota. He graduated from Homestead High School in Mequon, Wisconsin, and earned a Bachelor of Arts degree in history and political science from Marquette University in Milwaukee, Wisconsin.

Career
After graduating from college, Loucks served as an aide in the office of Senator Bob Kasten. He was first elected to the Assembly in 1988 as a Republican. After being re-elected in 1990, Loucks announced that he would not seek re-election in 1992.

After retiring from the Wisconsin State Assembly, Loucks moved to Washington, D.C., where he embarked on a career in public relations, working first for Ruder Finn before joining the American Society of Travel Agents (ASTA) as its director of communications. He most recently served as the CCO for Travel Leaders Group, a Minnesota-based travel agency company with nearly $21 billion in annual sales; Loucks departed the company in May 2017. Since 2021, he has worked as a talent consultant for Medtronic.

Loucks is also actively involved in the arts, having served on the Board of Directors for Minneapolis-based Theater Latte Da, a musical theater company, and supporter of Steppenwolf Theatre Company in Chicago, Illinois.

References

Politicians from Saint Paul, Minnesota
People from Mequon, Wisconsin
Republican Party members of the Wisconsin State Assembly
Marquette University alumni
1961 births
Living people